Double Peak is the descriptive name of a  double summit located in Mount Rainier National Park in Pierce County of Washington state. Part of the Cascade Range, it is situated northwest of Shriner Peak, south of Governors Ridge, and southeast of the Cowlitz Chimneys.

Climate
Double Peak is located in the marine west coast climate zone of western North America. Most weather fronts originate in the Pacific Ocean, and travel northeast toward the Cascade Mountains. As fronts approach, they are forced upward by the peaks of the Cascade Range (Orographic lift), causing them to drop their moisture in the form of rain or snowfall onto the Cascades. As a result, the west side of the Cascades experiences high precipitation, especially during the winter months in the form of snowfall. During winter months, weather is usually cloudy, but, due to high pressure systems over the Pacific Ocean that intensify during summer months, there is often little or no cloud cover during the summer. Precipitation runoff from Double Peak drains into tributaries of the Cowlitz River.

Gallery

References

External links

 National Park Service web site: Mount Rainier National Park
 Double Peak photo: Flickr
 Weather: Double Peak

Cascade Range
Mountains of Pierce County, Washington
Mountains of Washington (state)
Mount Rainier National Park
North American 1000 m summits